Sir Henry Crofton Lowther  (26 March 1858 – 23 November 1939) was a British diplomat, ambassador to Chile and Denmark.

Career
Henry Crofton Lowther was educated at Harrow School and Balliol College, Oxford. In 1879 he rowed in the Balliol VIII which went to the Head of the River. He joined the Diplomatic Service with the rank of Attaché in 1883. He was posted to The Hague in 1884, promoted to 3rd Secretary in 1885, and posted to Stockholm in 1886 and Berlin in 1888. He was promoted to 2nd Secretary with a posting to Rio de Janeiro, then moved to Constantinople in 1892, Madrid in 1894 and Bern in 1897.

Lowther returned to Rio de Janeiro as First Secretary of Legation in 1901, was posted to Tokyo as Councillor of Embassy in 1906, and served as Chargé d'Affaires at Madrid, Bern, Rio de Janeiro and Tokyo before being appointed Minister to Chile 1909–13 and finally Minister to Denmark 1913–16 "where he did good work and was a popular member of the Diplomatic Corps of that capital".

Henry Lowther was knighted KCMG in 1913 on appointment to Copenhagen, and GCVO in 1914. The Danish government awarded him the Grand Cross of the Order of the Dannebrog.

References
LOWTHER, Sir Henry Crofton, Who Was Who, A & C Black, 1920–2008; online edn, Oxford University Press, Dec 2007, accessed 16 April 2012

1858 births
1939 deaths
People educated at Harrow School
Alumni of Balliol College, Oxford
Ambassadors of the United Kingdom to Chile
Ambassadors of the United Kingdom to Denmark
Knights Grand Cross of the Royal Victorian Order
Knights Commander of the Order of St Michael and St George
Grand Crosses of the Order of the Dannebrog